Aleksandar Nađfeji (born October 27, 1976) is a retired Serbian professional basketball player and current coach.

Personal life
Aleksandar is the older brother of Stevan Nađfeji, who was also a professional basketball player. His second Son Nemanja Nađfeji is also a professional Basketball player.

References

External links
 Aleksandar Nađfeji at euroleague.com
 Aleksandar Nađfeji at eurobasket.com
 Aleksandar Nađfeji at  Basketball-Bundesliga.de

1976 births
Living people
Alba Berlin players
Basketball players from Belgrade
FC Bayern Munich basketball players
Köln 99ers players
Power forwards (basketball)
BKK Radnički players
Serbian expatriate basketball people in Germany
Serbian men's basketball players
Telekom Baskets Bonn players
Tigers Tübingen players